The 2017 World Mixed Curling Championship was held from 6 to 14 October at the Palladium de Champéry in Champéry, Switzerland.

Teams

Group A

Group B

Group C

Group D

Group E

(Cavullo) Withdrew

 (Sijja) Moved To Group B

Round-robin standings

Playoffs

1/8 Finals
Friday 13 October, 9:00

Friday 13 October, 13:00

1/4 Finals
Friday 13 October, 19:00

1/2 Finals
Saturday 14 October, 9:00

Final
Saturday 14 October, 14:00

Bronze final
Saturday 14 October, 14:00

References

External links

World Mixed Curling Championship
World Mixed Curling Championship
World Mixed Curling Championship
International curling competitions hosted by Switzerland
Sport in Valais
International sports competitions hosted by Switzerland
World Mixed Curling Championship